Josef Chovanec (born 1935) is a Czechoslovak boxer. He competed in the men's lightweight event at the 1956 Summer Olympics.

References

1935 births
Living people
Czechoslovak male boxers
Olympic boxers of Czechoslovakia
Boxers at the 1956 Summer Olympics
Place of birth missing (living people)
Lightweight boxers